Miloš Sádlo (13 April 1912 – 14 October 2003), a Czech cellist, was born in Prague, Czech Republic. Born Miloš Zátvrzský he took the name Sadlo after Karel Pravoslav Sádlo, his teacher and mentor.

He was known for his work editing, with Mstislav Rostropovich, the Joseph Haydn Cello Concerto No. 1 in C major from International Music.

References

1912 births
Czech classical cellists
2003 deaths
20th-century classical musicians
Musicians from Prague
20th-century cellists